Mattia Gavazzi (born 14 June 1983) is an Italian former road cyclist, who competed professionally between 2006 and 2016 for teams , , , , ,  and two spells with . In April 2010, Gavazzi was suspended by the Union Cycliste Internationale following a positive doping control for cocaine. He made his comeback in the 2013 Tour de San Luis. He is a specialist sprinter.

Biography
Mattia Gavazzi's father, Pierino Gavazzi, was also a professional rider.

He won a stage at the 2004 Girobio, the version of the Giro d'Italia for young amateur riders. He secured six victories with them in 2007, including three at the Tour de Normandie, showing his talent as a sprinter.

In February he achieved a second place in a stage of the Giro della Provincia di Grosseto, behind Danilo Napolitano and in front of Filippo Pozzato. The following month he was again second at the Settimana Internazionale di Coppi e Bartali, beaten by Francesco Chicchi. In April, he won a stage of the Settimana Ciclistica Lombarda, and in May the Giro di Toscana, beating Chicchi.

He won a stage at the Tour de San Luis and dominated at the Tour de Langkawi, winning four stages and the Points classification.

However, a urine sample taken two days previously tested positive for the presence of cocaine, and this triggered a suspension by the sport's governing body. He had previously tested positive for cocaine, and received a 14-month suspension, as an amateur in 2004.

Gavazzi made his return at the 2013 Tour de San Luis, where he won the last stage by out sprinting Slovak Peter Sagan. In April, he won the Giro di Toscana, a hilly race where he edged Ivan Rovny and Taylor Phinney in the sprint. Androni team manager Gianni Savio claimed that the split was due to Gavazzi demanding a guaranteed start for the 2014 Giro d'Italia. Gavazzi signed with the  team for the 2014 season.

On 12 April 2016, it was announced that Gavazzi had been provisionally suspended by the UCI for a cocaine positive taken at the 2015 Tour of Qinghai Lake. It was his third positive test to this substance during his career. He was given a four-year suspension, backdated to July 2015.

Major results
Source:

2003
 1st Coppa San Biagio
 1st Trofeo Antonietto Rancilio
2004
 1st Trofeo Gino Visentini
 1st Trofeo Papà Cervi
 1st Circuito del Porto
 1st Alta Padovana Tour
 1st Coppa San Biagio
 1st Trofeo Lampre
 1st Stage 10 Girobio
2006
 7th Giro del Mendrisiotto
2007
 1st Univest GP
 Istrian Spring Trophy
1st Stages 2 & 3
 Tour de Normandie
1st Stages 1, 2a & 2b
 1st Stage 2 Vuelta a Navarra
 10th Coppa Bernocchi
2008
 1st Giro di Toscana
 1st Stage 2 Settimana Ciclistica Lombarda
 1st Stage 5 Circuit de Lorraine
 1st Stage 5 Brixia Tour
 9th Gran Premio della Costa Etruschi
2009
 1st Stage 1 Tour de San Luis
 Tour de Langkawi
1st Points classification
1st Stages 1, 2, 3 & 6
 1st Stage 3 Settimana Ciclistica Lombarda
 Brixia Tour
1st Stages 1a & 5
 Vuelta a Venezuela
1st Stages 3a, 3b & 4
2010
 1st Stage 2 Settimana Ciclistica Lombarda
 4th Gran Premio della Costa Etruschi
2013
 1st Giro di Toscana
 1st Stage 7 Tour de San Luis
 1st Stage 3b Sibiu Cycling Tour
 1st Stage 3 Vuelta a Venezuela
 2nd Châteauroux Classic
2014
 Tour of Qinghai Lake
1st Stages 11 & 13
 1st Stage 2 Tour of China I
 1st Stage 1 Tour of China II
 Tour of Fuzhou
1st Points classification
1st Stage 3
 3rd Banja Luka–Belgrade I
2015
1st  Overall Tour of China II
1st Points classification
1st Stages 1, 4 & 5
 1st Stage 6 Vuelta a Mexico
 1st Stage 2 Tour of Estonia
Tour of Qinghai Lake
1st Stages 8, 10, 11 & 13
Tour of Fuzhou
1st Points classification
1st Stages 1 & 3
 3rd GP Adria Mobil
3rd Croatia–Slovenia

Grand Tour general classification results timeline

References

External links
 

1983 births
Living people
People from Iseo, Lombardy
Doping cases in cycling
Italian sportspeople in doping cases
Italian male cyclists
Vuelta a Venezuela stage winners
Cyclists from the Province of Brescia